Robert Tree Cody (born April 20, 1951) is an American musician, dancer, and educator.  He graduated from John Marshall High School in 1969. Robert is an adopted son of Hollywood actor Iron Eyes Cody.

Early life
Robert Tree Cody is the adopted son of the actor Iron Eyes Cody and Cody's wife Bertha Parker, an Assistant in Archaeology at Southwest Museum of the American Indian.  Iron Eyes and Bertha adopted Robert and his brother Arthur, who served in the United States Marine Corps during the Vietnam War and died as a result of exposure to Agent Orange. The brothers are of Dakota and Maricopa heritage. Robert is an enrolled member of the Salt River Pima-Maricopa Indian Community.  In the Maricopa language, his traditional name is Oou Kas Mah Quet, meaning "Thunder Bear".

Formerly of Big Bear, California, he now resides in Santa Ana Pueblo, New Mexico with his wife, Rachel. His nickname, "Tree," comes from his height: he is six feet nine and a half inches tall.  In 2009, Robert was interviewed about his father in the Canadian documentary Reel Injun.

Performer and musician
Robert Cody plays the Native American flute, has released albums with Canyon Records and toured throughout the Americas, Europe, and East Asia.  He performed the traditional carved wooden flute on several tracks of The Rippingtons' 1999 album Topaz.

He was a featured flautist in the tenth episode of the PBS series Reading Rainbow, entitled "The Gift of the Sacred Dog" (based on the book by Paul Goble).  It was filmed at Montana's Crow Agency reservation on June 17, 1983. He performed with Xavier Quijas Yxayotl (Huichol) from Guadalajara for the 2000 new age album Crossroads.

During the 1950s and '60s and '70s, Cody traveled the pow wow circuit extensively as a dancer.

References

External links
 

1951 births
American male dancers
American male television actors
Dakota people
Hunkpapa people
Living people
Male actors from Los Angeles
Musicians from Los Angeles
Native American flautists
Native American male actors
People from Big Bear Lake, California